Jeff Parker (born April 4, 1967) is an American guitarist and composer based in Los Angeles. Born in Connecticut and raised in Hampton, Virginia, Parker is best known as an experimental musician, working with jazz, electronic, rock, and improvisational groups. Parker studied at Berklee College of Music and then moved to Chicago in 1991.

Also a multi-instrumentalist, Parker has been a member of the post-rock group Tortoise since 1996, and was a founding member of Isotope 217 and the Chicago Underground Trio in the 1990s and early 2000s. He is a member of the Association for the Advancement of Creative Musicians (AACM) and has worked with George Lewis, Ernest Dawkins, Brian Blade, Joshua Redman, Fred Anderson, Meshell Ndegeocello, Joey DeFrancesco, Smog (aka Bill Callahan), Carmen Lundy and Jason Moran. A prolific sideman, he has also released seven albums as a solo artist: Like-Coping, The Relatives, Bright Light in Winter, The New Breed, Slight Freedom, Suite for Max Brown, and Forfolks.

Discography

As leader or co-leader
 Vega (with Bernard Santacruz and Michael Zerang) (Marge, 2002)
 Like-Coping (Delmark, 2003)
 Out Trios, Vol. 2 (with Michael Zerang and Kevin Drumm) (Atavistic, 2003)
 Song Songs Song (with Scott Fields) (Delmark, 2004)
 The Relatives (Thrill Jockey, 2005)
 Bright Light in Winter (Delmark, 2012)
 The New Breed (International Anthem, 2016)
 Slight Freedom (Eremite, 2016)
 Diagonal Filter (Not Two, 2018)
Suite for Max Brown (International Anthem/Nonesuch, 2020)
 Some Jellyfish Live Forever (with Rob Mazurek) (RogueArt, 2021) 
 Forfolks (Nonesuch, 2021)
 Eastside Romp (with Eric Revis and Nasheet Waits) (RogueArt, 2022) 
 Mondays at the Enfield Tennis Academy (Eremite, 2022)

With Tortoise
 TNT (Thrill Jockey, 1998)
 In the Fishtank (In the Fishtank, 1999)
 Standards (Thrill Jockey, 2001)
 It's All Around You (Thrill Jockey, 2004)
 The Brave and the Bold (Overcoat, 2006)
 Beacons of Ancestorship (Thrill Jockey, 2009)
 The Catastrophist (Thrill Jockey, 2016)

With Chicago Underground Quartet
Chicago Underground Quartet (Thrill Jockey, 2001)
Good Days (Astral Spirits, 2020)

With Chicago Underground Trio
Possible Cube (Delmark, 1999)
Flamethrower (Delmark, 2000)

With Rob Mazurek
Playground (Delmark, 1998)
Bill Dixon with Exploding Star Orchestra (Thrill Jockey, 2008)

With Makaya McCraven
 Universal Beings (International Anthem, 2018)

References

Bibliography
Fabian Holt, 2007. Jeff Parker and the Chicago Jazz Scene. In: Genre in Popular Music. Chicago and London: University of Chicago Press,

External links
Official website

1967 births
Living people
American jazz guitarists
Guitarists from Virginia
African-American guitarists
Delmark Records artists
American male guitarists
20th-century American guitarists
Tortoise (band) members
Isotope 217 members
Jazz musicians from Virginia
20th-century American male musicians
American male jazz musicians
20th-century African-American musicians
21st-century African-American people